BNG Bank N.V. is a Dutch bank specializing in providing financing for (semi-)publicly owned organizations. Ranked by assets alone, it is ranked as the 4th bank in the Netherlands. The Dutch state owns 50% of the company, while the remainder is owned by the municipalities and provinces.

The company was founded in 1914 in The Hague as the Gemeentelijke Credietbank (Municipal Credit Bureau), changed its name to Bank voor Nederlandsche Gemeenten in 1922, before finally changing it to BNG Bank in 2018.

BNG Bank does not provide financing to private customers, but exclusively to (semi-)public organizations, such as municipalities, provinces, public utilities, health care organisations and public housing.

Awards 
The magazine Global Finance rated BNG Bank the third safest bank in the world in its "World’s 50 Safest Banks 2019" rating. The rating is based on long-term foreign currency ratings from Fitch Ratings and Standard and Poor’s and the long-term bank deposit ratings from Moody’s Investors Service.

References

Further reading

External links
 

Banks of the Netherlands
Banks established in 1914
Privately held companies of the Netherlands
Banks under direct supervision of the European Central Bank
Dutch companies established in 1914
Local government finance